Buthus is a genus of scorpion belonging and being eponymous to the family Buthidae. It is distributed widely across northern Africa, including Morocco, Mauritania, Algeria, Tunisia, Libya, Egypt, Senegal, Guinea-Bissau, Nigeria, Sudan, Somalia, Ethiopia, Djibouti, as well as the Middle East, including Israel, Palestine, Jordan, Lebanon, Iraq, Yemen, and possibly Saudi Arabia and southern Turkey. Its European range includes the Iberian Peninsula, southern France, and Cyprus.

Taxonomy
The genus was introduced by W.E. Leach (1815: 391). It was only the second genus of scorpion as all species known to this date were included in the sole genus Scorpio Linné, 1758. Leach found Scorpio occitanus Amoreux, 1789 to differ from the other species of Scorpio known to him by having eight eyes (two median eyes and six lateral eyes) instead of six (two median eyes and four lateral eyes). C.L. Koch (1837) expanded this concept and subdivided the scorpions in four families according to the number of their eyes. He named his second family, the "eight-eyed scorpions", Buthides. The use of the number of eyes in the classification of scorpions has been discarded since, however the name Buthidae is still in use for the most diverse family of scorpions.

Diversity
The content of this genus may vary, depending on the authority. The best known species, B. occitanus, was once thought to be widespread from southern France, throughout Spain and Morocco, along the southern coast of the Mediterranean Sea, and eastwards as far as Israel. However, recent research has shown that it forms a highly diverse cluster of closely related but separate species. A number of taxa formerly considered as subspecies or "varieties" have been granted full species status, others have been described as entirely new. The Moroccan Atlas region is a hot-spot of diversity with at least 14 species. This diversity is explained by the topography which led to a high degree of speciation in populations which are separated from others by mountain ranges. Four species are considered to occur in Europe: B. occitanus (southern France, eastern and southern Spain), B. montanus (mountain ranges of southeastern Spain), B. ibericus (western Spain and Portugal), and B. kunti (Cyprus). At least 75 species are known, many of which are quite similar in appearance:

Buthus adrianae Rossi, 2013
Buthus ahaggar Ythier, Sadine, Haddadi & Lourenco, 2021
Buthus ajax (C. L. Koch, 1839)
Buthus alacanti Teruel & Turiel, 2020
Buthus albengai Lourenço, 2003
Buthus amri Lourenço, Yağmur & Duhem, 2010
Buthus apiatus Lourenço, El Bouhissi & Sadine, 2020
Buthus atlantis Pocock, 1889
Buthus aures Lourenço & Sadine, 2016
Buthus awashensis Kovařík, 2011
Buthus baeticus Teruel & Turiel, 2020
Buthus barcaeus Birula, 1909
Buthus berberensis Pocock, 1900
Buthus bobo Ythier, 2021
Buthus bonito Lourenço & Geniez, 2005
Buthus boumalenii Touloun & Boumezzough, 2011
Buthus boussaadi Lourenço, Chichi & Sadine, 2018
Buthus brignolii Lourenço, 2003
Buthus centroafricanus Lourenço, 2016
Buthus chambiensis Kovařík, 2006
Buthus confluens Lourenço, Touloun & Boumezzough, 2012
Buthus danyii Rossi, 2017
Buthus delafuentei Teruel & Turiel, 2020
Buthus draa Lourenço & Slimani, 2004
Buthus dunlopi Kovařík, 2006
Buthus duprei Rossi & Tropea, 2016
Buthus egyptiensis Lourenço, 2012
Buthus elhennawyi Lourenço, 2005
Buthus elizabethae Lourenço, 2005
Buthus elmoutakoualiki Lourenço & Qi, 2006
Buthus elongatus Rossi, 2012
Buthus gabani Ythier, 2021
Buthus garcialorcai Teruel & Turiel, 2020
Buthus goyffoni Abidi, Sadine & Lourenco, 2021
Buthus halius (C. L. Koch, 1839)
Buthus hassanini Lourenço, Duhem & Cloudsley-Thompson, 2012
Buthus ibericus Lourenço & Vachon, 2004
Buthus intermedius (Ehrenberg, 1829)
Buthus intumescens (Hemprich in Hemprich & Ehrenberg, 1828)
Buthus israelis Shulov & Amitai, 1959
Buthus jianxinae Lourenço, 2005
Buthus karoraensis Rossi & Tropea, 2016
Buthus kunti Yağmur, Koç & Lourenço, 2011
Buthus labuschagnei Lourenço, 2015
Buthus lienhardi Lourenço, 2003
Buthus lourencoi Rossi, Tropea & Yagmur, 2013
Buthus lusitanus Lourenço, 2021
Buthus malhommei Vachon, 1949
Buthus manchego Teruel & Turiel, 2020
Buthus mardochei Simon, 1878
Buthus mariaefrancae Lourenço, 2003
Buthus maroccanus Birula, 1903
Buthus montanus Lourenço & Vachon, 2004
Buthus nabataeus Lourenço, Abu Afifeh & Al-Saraireh, 2021
Buthus nigrovesiculosus Hirst, 1925
Buthus occidentalis Lourenço, Sun & Zhou, 2009
Buthus occitanus (Amoreux, 1789) type species
Buthus orientalis Lourenço & Simon, 2012
Buthus oudjanii Lourenço, 2017
Buthus paris (C.L. Koch, 1839)
Buthus pedrosousai Teruel & Turiel, 2021
Buthus pococki Kovarik, Stahlavsky & Elmi, 2020
Buthus prudenti Lourenço & Leguin, 2012
Buthus pusilus Lourenço, 2013
Buthus pyrenaeus Ythier, 2021
Buthus rochati Lourenço, 2003
Buthus saharicus Sadine, Bissati & Lourenço, 2015
Buthus serrano Teruel & Turiel, 2020
Buthus somalilandus Kovarik, Stahlavsky & Elmi, 2020
Buthus tassili Lourenço, 2002
Buthus trinacrius Lourenço & Rossi, 2013
Buthus tunetanus (Herbst, 1800)
Buthus yemenensis Lourenço, 2008
Buthus zeylensis Pocock, 1900

General characteristics
Members of Buthus are generally medium-sized scorpions (40–85 mm total length). Coloration is generally yellow, with different tones of brown to red-brown. Darker patterns may occur on various parts of the body. The pedipalps (pincers) are relatively gracile with slender digits and a globose base. The cephalothorax bears strong ornamentation with small granules arranged to form carinae (ridges). The most prominent carinae form a lyra-shaped pattern behind the median eyes in many species. The mesosoma is also often granulated and commonly bears three ridges on the tergites. The metasoma is slender but not thin with well developed carinae of granules, and some short spines in some species. A large vesicle terminates in a sharp and long aculeus (stinger).

Toxicity
Though generally not considered lethal, the venom of Buthus species is considered of medical importance. They form a considerable part of scorpion envenomation cases, especially in northern Africa. According to a study by Touloun et al. (2001) scorpions of the B. occitanus complex caused 26% of all recorded cases in southwestern Morocco, but none of them resulted in death.

Habitat
Species of Buthus live in semi-arid to arid climate in various terrains, from mountain valleys to coastal plains mostly with sparse vegetation, even in deserts. As most scorpions they are predominantly nocturnal and hide in shallow burrows, most commonly below stones.

References

External links
 Images of various species of Buthus. The Scorpion Fauna. Scorpions of Europe

Buthidae
Scorpions of Africa